This is a full list of the mammals indigenous to the U.S. state of Nebraska. It consists of 89 mammals either live or have lived in the state. As a state located in the northern Great Plains, Nebraska has a diverse mammalian fauna, due to the intersection of major climatic and environmental zones within its boundaries.

The following tags are used to highlight each species' conservation status as assessed by the International Union for Conservation of Nature:

Opossums
Family Didelphidae (Opossums)
Subfamily: Didelphinae
Genus: Didelphis
 Virginia opossum, D. virginiana

Armadillos
Family Dasypodidae (Armadillos)
Genus: Dasypus
 Nine-banded armadillo, D. novemcinctus

Insectivores
Eulipotyphlans are insectivorous mammals. Shrews closely resemble mice, while moles are stout-bodied burrowers.
Family Soricidae (shrews)
Genus: Blarina
 Northern short-tailed shrew B. brevicauda 
 Elliot's short-tailed shrew B. hylophaga 
Genus: Cryptotis
 North American least shrew C. parva 
Genus: Sorex
 Masked shrew S. cinereus 
Family Talpidae (moles)
Genus: Scalopus
 Eastern mole, S. aquaticus

Lagomorphs
Family Lagomorpha (rabbits, hares and pikas)
Genus: Lepus
Black-tailed jackrabbit, L. californicus  
White-tailed jackrabbit, L. townsendii 
Genus: Sylvilagus
Desert cottontail, S. audubonii 
Eastern cottontail, S. floridanus 
Mountain cottontail, S. nuttallii

Rodents
Family Castoridae (beavers)
Genus: Castor
North American beaver, C. canadensis 
Family Cricetidae (New World mice, rats, voles, lemmings, muskrats)
Genus: Microtus
Prairie vole, M. ochrogaster 
Meadow vole, M. pennsylvanicus 
Woodland vole, M. pinetorum 
Genus: Myodes
Southern red-backed vole, M. gapperi 
Genus: Neotoma
Bushy-tailed woodrat, N. cinerea  
Eastern woodrat, N. floridana 
Genus: Onychomys
Northern grasshopper mouse, O. leucogaster 
Genus: Peromyscus
White-footed mouse, P. leucopus 
North American deermouse, P. maniculatus 
Genus: Ondatra
Muskrat, O. zibethicus 
Genus: Peromyscus
White-footed mouse, P. leucopus 
Western deer mouse, P. sonoriensis 
Genus: Reithrodontomys
Western harvest mouse, R. megalotis 
Plains harvest mouse, R. montanus 
Genus: Sigmodon
Hispid cotton rat, S. hispidus 
Genus: Synaptomys
Southern bog lemming, S. cooperi 
Family Dipodidae (jumping mice)
Genus: Zapus
Meadow jumping mouse, Z. hudsonius 
Family Erethizontidae (New World porcupines)
Genus: Erethizon
North American porcupine, E. dorsatum 
Family Muridae (Old World mice and rats)
Genus: Mus
House mouse, M. musculus  introduced
Genus: Rattus
Brown rat, R. norvegicus  introduced
Black rat, R. rattus  introduced
Family Sciuridae (squirrels)
Genus: Glaucomys
Southern flying squirrel, G. volans 
Genus: Marmota
Groundhog, M. monax 
Genus: Sciurus
Eastern gray squirrel, S. carolinensis 
Fox squirrel, S. niger 
Genus: Urocitellus
Wyoming ground squirrel, U. elegans 
Genus: Poliocitellus
Franklin's ground squirrel, P. franklinii 
Genus: Xerospermophilus
Spotted ground squirrel, X. spilosoma
Genus: Neotamias
Least chipmunk, N. minimus 
Genus: Ictidomys
Thirteen-lined ground squirrel, I. tridecemlineatus 
Genus: Tamias
Eastern chipmunk, T. striatus 
Genus: Cynomys
Black-tailed prairie dog, C. ludovicianus 
Family Heteromyidae (pocket mice and kangaroo rats)
Genus: Perognathus
Olive-backed pocket mouse, P. fasciatus 
Plains pocket mouse, P. flavescens 
Silky pocket mouse, P. flavus 
Genus: Chaetodipus
Hispid pocket mouse, C. hispidus 
Genus: Dipodomys 
Ord's kangaroo rat, D. ordii 
Family Geomyidae (pocket gophers)
Genus: Geomys
Plains pocket gopher, G. bursarius 
Genus: Thomomys
Northern pocket gopher, T. talpoides

Bats
Family Vespertilionidae (vesper bats)
Genus: Aeorestes
Hoary bat, A. cinereus 
Genus: Corynorhinus
Townsend's big-eared bat, C. townsendii 
Genus: Eptesicus
Big brown bat, E. fuscus 
Genus: Lasionycteris
Silver-haired bat, L. noctivagans 
Genus: Lasiurus
Eastern red bat, L. borealis 
Genus: Myotis
Western small-footed myotis, M. ciliolabrum 
Little brown bat, M. lucifugus 
Northern long-eared bat, M. septentrionalis 
Fringed myotis, M. thysanodes 
Long-legged myotis, M. volans 
Genus: Nycticeius
Evening bat, N. humeralis 
Genus: Perimyotis
Tricolored bat, P. subflavus 
Family Free-tailed bat (free-tailed bats)
Genus: Tadarida
Mexican free-tailed bat, T. brasiliensis

Carnivores
Family Canidae (canids)
Genus: Canis
 Coyote, C. latrans 
Gray wolf, C. lupus  extirpated
Great Plains wolf, C. l. nubilus extinct
Genus: Vulpes
Swift fox, V. velox 
Red fox, V. vulpes 
Family Procyonidae (raccoons)
Genus: Procyon
Common raccoon, P. lotor 
Family Ursidae (bears)
Genus: Ursus
American black bear, U. americanus 
Brown bear, U. arctos  extirpated
Grizzly bear, U. a. horribilis extirpated
Family Felidae (cats)
Genus: Lynx
Canada lynx, L. canadensis  extirpated, vagrant
Bobcat, L.  rufus 
Genus: Puma
Cougar, P. concolor  
Family Mustelidae (weasels, minks, martens, fishers, and otters)
Genus: Lontra
North American river otter, L. canadensis  reintroduced
Genus: Mustela
Black-footed ferret, M. nigripes  extirpated
Least weasel, M. nivalis 
Genus: Neogale
Long-tailed weasel, N. frenata 
American mink, N. vison  
Genus: Taxidea
American badger, T. taxus  
Family Mephitidae (skunks)
Genus: Mephitis
Striped skunk, M. mephitis 
Genus: Spilogale
Western spotted skunk, S. gracilis 
Eastern spotted skunk, S. putorius

Even-toed ungulates
Family Cervidae (deer)
Genus: Alces
Moose, A. alces  vagrant
Genus: Cervus
Elk, C. canadensis  reintroduced
Genus: Odocoileus
Mule deer, O. hemionus 
White-tailed deer, O. virginianus  
Family Bovidae (bovids)
Genus: Bison
American bison, B. bison  reintroduced
Genus: Ovis
Bighorn sheep, O. canadensis  reintroduced
Family Antilocapridae (pronghorns)
Genus: Antilocapra
Pronghorn, A. americana

References

Mammals
Nebraska